The Natick Mall (previously named the Natick Collection) is a shopping mall in Natick, Massachusetts. The original facility was the first enclosed shopping mall in Greater Boston upon opening in 1966; it was demolished and replaced by a larger building in 1994 and expanded in 2007. The mall, with the adjacent Shopper's World power center in Framingham, are components of the Golden Triangle shopping district in the center of MetroWest, situated between Route 9 and Route 30. With  of gross leasable area, it is the largest shopping complex in New England. It is owned and managed by Brookfield Properties, a subsidiary of Brookfield Asset Management.

The Natick Mall is anchored by Nordstrom, Macy's, and Wegmans.

History

Opening of original mall 
The original Natick Mall was developed by businessmen William Lane, Stephen Mugar, and John Brennan. The project was one of the first enclosed malls in Greater Boston, and among the first built east of the Mississippi River. It was dedicated on April 27, 1966, with two smaller anchors on the north end of the mall, Woolworth's, Pray's Furniture, and a large fountain/entertainment area in front of Sears. Other charter tenants included Thom McAn, Baker Shoes, Ann Taylor, Parklane Hosiery, and a Hot Shoppes Cafeteria (later a York Steak House). Pray's Furniture was eventually replaced with a Boston Baby store, but after the closure of Boston Baby in the early 1980s, the vacant space was redeveloped into an additional retail wing and a four-bay food court.

By 1985, the mall had been acquired from the original owners by S.R. Weiner & Associates and William Finard, and, aside from the conversion of the former Boston Baby wing, the overall facility and retail mix had been virtually unchanged since opening in 1966. Weiner and Finard proposed an expansion of the mall, which would include the addition of a Lord & Taylor anchor as well as a second level of retail. However, not enough capital could be raised, and, coupled with lawsuits with Shopper's World owner Melvin Simon (who had made a controversial redevelopment proposal of that mall), the project was suspended indefinitely. Filene's proceeded with a renovation of its store in 1990 as part of the former expansion plans. This part was completed in 1991.

1992–1994 construction of replacement 

By the early 1990s, the outdated mall had caused many shoppers to go to other larger, more modern area malls. In 1992, the Homart Development Company purchased the Natick Mall and the adjacent Shopper's World in Framingham for redevelopment. Initial plans called for the Natick Mall to become a power center and Shopper's World an enclosed shopping mall; however, Filene's was unwilling to spend more capital on a new building at Shopper's World after remodeling their store in the mall, thus the plans were switched onto the opposite properties.

The original mall, except Filene's, was demolished in June 1993; its two-floor replacement, originally slated to open in August 1994, opened on October 12, 1994. It included previous anchor stores Filene's, Jordan Marsh, and a rebuilt Sears in addition to new anchor store Lord & Taylor. Jordan Marsh was purchased by Federated Department Stores in 1994, and the nameplate was replaced by Macy's chain-wide in 1996.

Macy's relocated from the Jordan Marsh space to the Filene's space in 2006 when Macy's merged with Filene's. J. C. Penney opened in the former Jordan Marsh/Macy's space on March 9, 2007.

2006–2009 renovation and expansion 
In late 2006, the mall began a renovation and expansion project. Its image was re-branded, first by attempting to change its name to simply Natick. After resistance from the town, the mall was instead renamed the Natick Collection. The first phase saw the renovation of the existing facility and the addition of a new wing on the property's north-east end, on the site of the former Wonder Bread/Hostess factory. The expansion added two new anchors, Nordstrom and Neiman Marcus, and nearly 100 new stores to the mall. This phase was opened to the public on September 7, 2007, though some stores planned to open through the winter and following spring. Construction of a Crate & Barrel, a relocated California Pizza Kitchen, and an American Girl Boutique and Bistro began in April 2008, with an original completion time frame of early spring 2009. The new  Crate & Barrel facility replaced the original  store with a new one-level store (with two-story facade) that occupies parts of the original location. In October 2009, the second phase of the expansion, "The Promenade at Natick Collection", opened on the south-western section of the mall along Route 9; a Cheesecake Factory opened shortly after. The third phase, the construction of the condominiums, which originally had a projected completion of summer 2008, finished construction during spring 2009. The final phase is the proposed addition of a ten to twelve story luxury hotel adjacent to the new wing and across from J. C. Penney. Initial site work was completed in 2008. With the addition and the new eight-story parking facility, the Natick Collection became the twenty-third largest mall in the country, fourth largest on the east coast, and the largest in New England.

The Great Recession negatively effected mall expansion. By December 2008, condominium sales in Nouvelle at Natick were behind projections, with only 34 of the 215 units sold or under contract. Real estate agents in the Metrowest area stated that the prices of the units, ranging from $379,900 to over $1 million, combined with the timing of the opening of the facility have harmed sales. Several real estate agencies stated that the developer would have had to lower its prices for the units to attract consumers. Additionally, home sales in the Natick and Framingham area are traditionally oriented towards single family homes. On September 10, 2009, The Boston Globe reported that Nouvelle at Natick would auction off 42 of the 215 units, with bids starting as low as $160,000.

2010s 
In July 2011, the Natick Collection reverted to its original name, the Natick Mall, citing local tradition.

In 2015, It was announced Wegmans would be replacing JCPenney. This was discussed by analysts as following suit with the "emerging trend" of nontraditional anchors in order to "emphasize experiences and fun over shopping". Construction began in 2016 and the store was opened on April 29, 2018. It is the first Wegmans to have multiple levels, entrances within a shopping center, and a full-service restaurant.

E-commerce retailer Wayfair opened its first brick-and-mortar store, a pop-up for the holiday season, from November 10, 2018, through January 2, 2019.

2020s 
On June 23, 2020, Level99 announced its plans to open a location around June 2021. Level99 plans to create an entertainment complex with over 48,000 square feet and including 92-seat taproom, a 140-seat beer hall with counter service and communal tables, an executive dining room, and a function room. There will be over 40 gaming opportunities. Each gaming experience will be categorized by their design elements, such as Aztec Temple, Space Void, Apocalypse, Pirates, Magician, Rainforest and Mansion. There will be seven different arenas for player-versus-player, in addition to an immersive art scavenger hunt installed by several Boston artists. Upon arrival each player will choose a gamer name and receive a wristband to track progress and collect bonuses. CEO Matt DuPlessie, who previously founded 5 Wits, spent five years developing this franchise. Its financial backers include the founder of Panera Bread and Au Bon Pain.

The 2020s saw several traditional department store retailers update their brick-and-mortar retail divisions after being disrupted by digital retailers.

On August 27, 2020, Lord & Taylor announced they would be retiring their traditional brick-and-mortar division after modernizing into a single digital collective outpost. This structure is set to be completely rebuilt, creating a vibrant "city within a city" like atmosphere.

On September 20, 2020, Neiman Marcus announced plans to shutter their location in Natick Mall. Closure was expected to take place in September 2022. 

On January 9, 2022, it was reported that Brookfield, the mall owner and developer, has partnered with real estate developer Bulfinch Companies to aquire the original Neiman Marcus location for around $12.6 million. On May 16, 2022, it was reported that Bulfinch has proposed a development that will include additional office, medical, and lab space. The structure will receive a third floor, which will be set back to allow space for terraces and a green roof. The new three-floor 135,000-square-foot structure which will include a penthouse, lobby, and terraces.

On January 12, 2022, Luxury electric vehicle maker Lucid Motors announced plans to open by September, 2022.

On December 11, 2022 Puttshack announced plans to open a two-level 22,000-square-foot location by the end of 2023. Puttshack is set to feature three nine-hole courses.

List of anchor stores

Architecture 
Following a two-level, generally T-shaped floor plan, the Natick Mall spans . With its late-2000s expansion, it makes use of natural lighting with the intention of providing an open atmosphere. Its curved ceiling was inspired by the name Natick, meaning "place of rolling hills" in the Massachusett language. Much of the mall's design incorporates the leaves of the birch tree. The expansion provided an underground parking garage in addition to its three existing structures. The lower level incorporates porcelain tile flooring, while the upper level uses engineered hardwood flooring; the design utilizes glass fixtures throughout. The exterior of the Neiman Marcus location is covered by  curved stainless steel panels colored in various shades of brown; it is intended to resemble a woman's dress.

Ownership 
Homart Development Corporation (then a division of Sears) was acquired by General Growth Properties (GGP) in December 1995, at which time the Natick Mall was valued at $265 million. GGP itself was later acquired by Brookfield Property Partners, and management was transferred to the Brookfield Properties subsidiary in August 2018.

Reception 
MassLive ranked the Natick Mall first-place on their list of 40 shopping malls in Massachusetts in December 2018, citing its "balanced combination of high-end stores and typical mall fare."

See also 
 Shopper's World – Power center adjacent to the mall
 Golden Triangle – District in which the mall is as  located

References

External links 

 

Buildings and structures in Natick, Massachusetts
Brookfield Properties
MetroWest
Shopping malls established in 1965
Shopping malls in Massachusetts
Tourist attractions in Middlesex County, Massachusetts